Thetukadu is a small village in Tamil Nadu, India,  from Salem. It is on the foothills of Kolli Hills. A Periasamy temple is in the village. Agriculture is the mainstay of the residents of this village. No industries are found there.

Villages in Namakkal district